Jungle is a British electronic music project founded in 2013 by producers Josh Lloyd-Watson and Tom McFarland.

Jungle have released three studio albums. 2014's Jungle was shortlisted for the Mercury Prize that year.  Their second album was 2018's For Ever through XL Recordings, while their third album, Loving in Stereo, was released on 13 August 2021 via Caiola Records. The group is based in London.

Background
Jungle was founded by Josh Lloyd-Watson and Tom McFarland. The pair had been friends since they were nine years old, where they lived next door to each other in Shepherd's Bush, London. 
They went on to form Jungle at the beginning of 2013, choosing to put an aesthetic emphasis on the music's surrounding artwork and videos, and not on the pairs' own identity (Lloyd-Watson and McFarland came to be known as J and T). Throughout the following year Jungle developed its nature as a collective by working with different artists across diverse disciplines. To perform the music live, Jungle expanded to a seven-piece band, fronted by J and T. The pair wished to challenge themselves, resisting the temptation to simply re-produce their music from their laptops, and instead translated their songs into a full and organic live experience. J and T have explained that Jungle stemmed from a desire for ‘honesty… true connection and friendship. It's about being in a collective and collective energy… [a] team spirit.’

Musical career

2013–2018: Jungle 

Jungle released their single "The Heat" on 21 October 2013 through Chess Club Records. In December 2013, Jungle were nominated for BBC's Sound of 2014 prize. That year, the group played at South by Southwest in Texas in March 2014. On 16 June 2014, the band played on Jimmy Kimmel Live!, and played Glastonbury Festival later that month.

Their debut album Jungle was released through XL Recordings on 14 July 2014. To celebrate the release, the band played a special launch party on a Peckham rooftop. The show was filmed using drones. During launch week the band played live sessions on BBC Radio 1, 2 and 6 Music.

During August 2014, the band played Reading and Leeds Festivals. During September 2014, Jungle played live on Le Grand Journal (Canal+), played with Pharrell Williams at London's Roundhouse for the iTunes Festival, and played live on Later... with Jools Holland.

The album "Jungle" was shortlisted for the 2014 Mercury Prize in September 2014. "Busy Earnin'" was also voted in at Number 67 in the 2014 Triple J Hottest 100 Countdown in Australia.

In early 2015, it was announced that the band would perform at the Boston Calling Music Festival in May 2015. On 26 June 2015, Jungle played on the Other Stage at the 2015 Bonnaroo Music and Arts Festival. On 9 December 2017, they performed as part of the line up of Trópico, a 3-day-long music festival in Acapulco, Mexico.

Use of songs in media 
Their song "Busy Earnin'" has been featured in many television shows and other media. It is present in the playlists of FIFA 15 and Forza Horizon 2 and was featured in TV productions several times, e.g. in the opening sequence and credits for the Tales from the Borderlands episode "Zer0 Sum", as a background music in a bar in Season 2 Episode 6 of Brooklyn Nine-Nine as well as in a club scene in German television series Tatort (episode 916: "Der Wüstensohn"). Since the end of 2014, "Busy Earnin'" has been the title song of the German TV show Mein bester Feind. It was also featured in season 2, episode 10 of American sitcom "Superstore".Also in the American TV show House of Lies. In 2022, iTV Sport’s British Touring Car Championship TV broadcasts race results and championship standing screens featured instrumental “Happy Man” and “Smile” as background audio.

2018–2019: For Ever 

On 8 May 2018, Jungle released two new singles, "House in L.A." and "Happy Man," on a 7-inch record, and on multiple digital music platforms.

On 22 September 2018, the band played their single "Heavy, California" on Jimmy Kimmel Live! and, on 11 December 2018, the band played their single "Smile" on The Late Show with Stephen Colbert.

Use of songs in media 
On 13 September 2018, their single "Heavy, California" was used to open the Apple September event. In December 2018, the band's single Platoon was used for the Peloton Digital Commercial. Their single "Beat 54" was featured in football video game by EA Sports, FIFA 19. Recently during the summer of 2019, Jungle's song, "The Heat", was played in Starbucks Nitro Cold Brew TV Commercial, 'Whoa Nitro' Starbucks. Their single "Happy Man" was featured in a commercial by phone network O2 in 2019, the first season of Spanish Netflix series Elite, and as the opening theme to the Apple TV+ show WeCrashed.

In April 2017 their track "Busy Earnin'" was used for the Toyota Yaris Hybrid TV advert.

2021–present: Loving in Stereo 
On 16 March 2021, Jungle premiered a trailer for "Loving in Stereo" featuring a vignette of the dancers regularly associated with the collective from previous videos, performing in some sort of abandoned compound or prison. As of the date of the trailer's release, it was initially unclear whether the title was in reference to their next album or just a single.

It was not until 22 March 2021 that Loving in Stereo was confirmed as the title of their third studio album, by way of the announcement of the album's first single, "Keep Moving" which premiered via Annie Mac's BBC Radio 1's Hottest Record on 23 March 2021.

Music videos 
Jungle is known for their one-shot dance videos directed by Josh Lloyd-Watson, one-half of Jungle, who often works with the same dancers, choreographer, and cinematographer.

Music videos for Casio, Heavy California, Cherry and the directors cut for Happy Man, were choreographed by Nat Zangi and Kane Klendjian (KZ Creatives) who also stars in the Happy Man. All four music videos were directed by Josh Lloyd-Watson and Charlie Di Placido, with Oliver Hadlee Pearch co-directing on Happy Man. The director of photography for all four videos was Olly Wiggins.

The dancers in Casio are Will West, Che Jones, Nathaniel Williams, Jordan Melchor, Ziggy Taylor and Mette Linturi.

Members

Jungle
Josh Lloyd-Watson – lead vocals, guitar, bass, piano, keyboards, synthesizers, sampler 
Tom McFarland – lead vocals, bass, keyboards, synths, samplers, 

Touring

Lydia Kitto – lead vocals keyboards, flute, guitar 
George Day – drums, samplers , percussion 
Geo Jordan – percussion, guitar, keyboards, bass, backing vocals 
Dominic Whalley – percussion, synthesizers, backing vocals 
Andreya Triana – backing vocals 

Andro Cowperthwaite – backing vocals 
Jordan "PHANTOMjjjjj" Hadfield – bass, drums, percussion, backing vocals 
Fraser MacColl – guitar, bass, backing vocals 
Rudi Salmon – backing vocals  
Nat Zangi – backing vocals

Discography

Studio albums

Singles

As featured artist

Remixes

Music videos

Awards and nominations

References

External links

 

2013 establishments in England
English musical duos
Musical groups from London
Musical groups established in 2013
People from Shepherd's Bush
XL Recordings artists